Nafusi (also spelt Nefusi) is a Berber language spoken in the Nafusa Mountains, a large area in northwestern Libya. Its primary speakers are the Ibadite communities around Jadu, Nalut and Yafran.

The dialect of Yefren in the east differs somewhat from that of Nalut and Jadu in the west. A number of Old Nafusi phrases appear in Ibadite manuscripts as early as the 12th century.

The dialect of Jadu is described in some detail in Beguinot (1931). Motylinski (1898) describes the dialect of Jadu and Nalut as spoken by a student from Yefren.

Nafusi shares several innovations with the Zenati languages, but unlike these other Berber varieties it maintains prefix vowels before open syllables. For example, ufəs "hand" < *afus, rather than Zenati fus. It appears especially closely related to Sokni and Siwi to its east.

Phonology

Vowels 

 Vowels may also be shortened /ĭ, ɛ̆, ă, ɔ̆, ŭ/ or lengthened as /iː, ɛː, aː, ɔː, uː/.

 /a/ can also be heard as [æ, ɒ] and /u/ as [ʊ] in different environments.

Consonants

References

External links
 Nafusi Swadesh List

Eastern Berber languages
Berbers in Libya
Languages of Libya
Tripolitania